Sulaiman Layeq (sometimes also Romanised as Laeq or Laiq) (12 October 1930 - 31 July 2020) was an Afghan politician, ideologue and poet who held the positions of President of the Academy of Sciences, full member of the Afghan Politburo, and Minister of Nationalities and Tribal Affairs.

Biography
Initially a student of the College of Theology, he graduated from the College of Literature in 1958. Laeq was a poet and writer in Pashtu and Dari. During 1957–68, Laeq held different posts in the national controlled media.

One of his sisters was married to Mir Akbar Khyber (a leading leftist ideologue whose murder in 1978 started the Saur Revolution); another sister was married to Sibghatullah Mojaddedi (who would later become President of Afghanistan). Laeq was a founder of the newspaper Parcham in 1968. Together with Babrak Karmal he represented the moderate faction of the People's Democratic Party of Afghanistan (PDPA). At the same time, he became a permanent member of the Central Committee of the Parcham parliamentary group. After the Saur Revolution, Laeq became Minister for Radio and Television in 1978 and for a time was admitted to membership in the Politburo after the government had expelled the Parchamis. Sulaiman also wrote lyrics of National anthem of the Democratic Republic of Afghanistan.

After the Khalq Government had removed most Parchamis, Laeq served as a temporary candidate member of the Politburo. Though he was imprisoned for being pro-Karmal the authorities treated him mildly. By 1980, following the intervention of the Soviet Army in Afghanistan, Laeq held several posts. By this time he had become a member of the Central Committee of the Parcham faction of the PDPA.

In 1981 he was promoted to President of the Academy of Sciences, full member of the Afghan Politburo, and Minister of Nationalities and Tribal Affairs.

Books
 Chunghar چونغر
 De Abaseen Spaiday د اباسين سپېدې
 Kaygday کېږدۍ
 Qeesay Aw Afsanay قصې او افسانې

References

External links
 http://www.spinta.de/

1930 births
Afghan secularists
Afghan socialists
Afghan democracy activists
20th-century Afghan poets
People's Democratic Party of Afghanistan politicians
2020 deaths
Government ministers of Afghanistan
Pashto-language poets
21st-century Afghan poets